Coyote Blue is a novel by American writer Christopher Moore, published in 1994.

The plot concerns a salesman in Santa Barbara, California, named Sam Hunter (a Crow Indian born Samson Hunts Alone) who, as a teenager, fled his home on the reservation when he was involved in the death of a law officer. The novel begins when the adult Sam has his life turned upside down by Coyote, the ancient Native American trickster-god.

One of the minor characters, "Minty Fresh" becomes an important feature of Moore's later work A Dirty Job.

In addition, Coyote Blue makes passing references to "Augustus Brine," from Moore's first novel, Practical Demonkeeping, and "Detective Sergeant Alphonso Rivera," from Practical Demonkeeping, Bloodsucking Fiends, A Dirty Job, You Suck, Bite Me, and Secondhand Souls.

Coyote also mentions having met Jesus Christ who was one of the main characters from Moore's novel Lamb: The Gospel According to Biff, Christ's Childhood Pal and made a minor appearance in Island of the Sequined Love Nun.

External links
Author's webpage for Coyote Blue

1994 American novels
Absurdist fiction
American fantasy novels
Novels by Christopher Moore
1994 fantasy novels
Novels set in California
Santa Barbara, California